The Bancroft Award is an award of the Royal Society of Canada "given for publication, instruction, and research in the earth sciences that have conspicuously contributed to public understanding and appreciation of the subject".

The award was endowed in 1968 to honour her late husband by the wife of Joseph Austin Bancroft (1882–1957), formerly Dawson Professor at McGill University. It is normally awarded on a biennial basis and consists of a presentation scroll and a cash award of CAD $2,500.

Recipients
 1968 - John Tuzo Wilson, FRSC 
 1970 - David M. Baird, FRSC
 1975 - E.R. Ward Neale, FRSC
 1976 - Roger A. Blais
 1978 - Frank Kenneth North
 1980 - William W. Hutchison
 1982 - Christopher R. Barnes, FRSC
 1984 - Jack G. Souther
 1986 - Derek York, FRSC
 1990 - Steven D. Scott, FRSC
 1992 - Godfrey S. Nowlan
 1994 - Alan V. Morgan
 1996 - Dale A. Russell
 2000 - Jan Veizer, FRSC
 2002 - John J. Clague, FRSC
 2004 - William Richard Peltier, FRSC
 2006 - David J. Dunlop, FRSC
 2008 - Anthony E. Williams-Jones, FRSC
 2010 - Frank C. Hawthorne
 2014 - Guy Narbonne
 2016 - Barbara Sherwood Lollar, FRSC
 2018 - Michel Jébrak
 2020 - Irena Creed, FRSC
 2022 - Sandra M. Barr

See also
 List of geology awards
 List of geographers
 List of prizes named after people
 List of science and technology awards

References

Canadian science and technology awards
Royal Society of Canada
Geology awards
Awards established in 1968
Earth sciences